Irena Koprowska, née Grasberg (May 12, 1917, Warsaw - August 16, 2012, Wynnewood Pennsylvania, USA) was a Polish-born pathologist in the United States, and the first woman to be named a full professor at Hahnemann Medical College, now Drexel University College of Medicine.

Koprowska was mentored by Dr. Georgios Papanikolaou the inventor of the "Pap smear", and went on to become a leader in the field of cytopathology. Dr. Koprowska was a founding member of the Inter Society Council of Cytology, which became the American Society of Cytopathology and which, in 1985, gave her its Papanikolaou Award. Additionally, she co-authored, with Dr. George Papanicolaou, a case report of the earliest diagnosis of lung cancer by a sputum smear.

Grasberg married Hilary Koprowski, a virologist who discovered the first effective oral polio vaccine.

References

http://articles.philly.com/2012-08-27/news/33403544_1_lung-cancer-pathology-professor-medicine-reports
Koprowska, I, A Woman Wanders Through Life and Science, SUNY series, Voices of Immigrant Women, SUNY press 1998
http://www.nlm.nih.gov/changingthefaceofmedicine/physicians/biography_187.html
http://onlinelibrary.wiley.com/doi/10.1002/cncy.21250001/abstract
 :pl:Irena Koprowska

1917 births
2012 deaths
American pathologists
20th-century  Polish Jews
Polish emigrants to the United States